The men's 20 kilometres road run event at the 1988 World Junior Championships in Athletics was held in Sudbury, Ontario, Canada, on 31 July.

Medalists

Results

Final
31 July

Participation
According to an unofficial count, 34 athletes from 25 countries participated in the event.

References

20 kilometres road run
Road running at the World Junior Championships in Athletics